18 Monkeys on a Dead Man's Chest is an album by David Thomas and Two Pale Boys, released in March 2004.

Track listing
All tracks composed by David Thomas, Andy Diagram and Keith Moliné
"New Orleans Fuzz" – 3:44
"Numbers Man" – 4:36
"Little Sister" – 3:09
"Habeas Corpus" – 4:27
"Brunswick Parking Lot" – 5:51
"Nebraska Alcohol Abuse" – 6:17
"Sad Eyed Lowlands" – 5:19
"Golden Surf" – 4:30
"Prepare for The End" – 7:08

Personnel 
David Thomas and Two Pale Boys
David Thomas – vocals, melodeon, musette 
Keith Moliné – guitar, violin
Andy Diagram – trumpet
Technical
Paul Hamann - engineer
John Thompson - artwork

David Thomas (musician) albums
2004 albums